Ladies vs Ricky Bahl is a 2011 Indian Hindi-language romantic comedy film directed by Maneesh Sharma from a screenplay by Devika Bhagat and produced by Aditya Chopra for Yash Raj Films. It stars Ranveer Singh, Anushka Sharma, Parineeti Chopra, Dipannita Sharma, and Aditi Sharma. In the film, a group of women team up to con Ricky Bahl (Singh), a con artist who has conned them.

The story was inspired by Jeffrey Archer's novel Not a Penny More, Not a Penny Less. Ladies vs Ricky Bahl released on 9 December 2011 and was a moderate commercial success at the box office. It received mixed-to-positive reviews from critics, who praised the chemistry of the lead pair, with particular praise directed towards Parineeti Chopra's performance; however it received criticism for its plot and pacing.

At the 57th Filmfare Awards, Parineeti Chopra won the Best Female Debut award for her performance in the film, in addition to a Best Supporting Actress nomination at the same ceremony.

Plot 

Story 1: Delhi

Dimple Chaddha is presented as a spoilt brat since her father Suresh Chaddha is the creator of "Chaddha Industries", a huge finance company in Delhi. Dimple is used to meeting her boyfriend, Sunny Singh secretly. The two party all night, and one day, eventually Dimple passes out of alcohol. Sunny then drops her home and faces her parents before wandering off. He breaks into a bungalow nearby and starts to throw stones on windows claiming it was part of his family inheritance and consequently is chased by the residents. Later he explains to Dimple that the bungalow actually belongs to his father, who died shortly before, and was encroached by tenants, but he gets taxed. Dimple convinces her father to help him but he tries to make profit out of it by buying the property at less valuation. Her father claims later as if he had fooled Sunny big time, though he is later arrested when the police claims that the family living there had a stay order, and that he entered there with no permission. Dimple realizes she has been conned, and starts to cry out loud. Then, Sunny is spotted in an airport leaving for Mumbai, with the Rs.20 lakhs which he receives as an advance from Dimple's father.

Story 2: Mumbai

Raina Parulekar is a businesswoman in Mumbai who is paranoid about everything. She has been ordered by her boss to deliver an M.F. Hussain painting, which is sold out everywhere. She meets Deven Shah, who presumably owns an art gallery that comprises the painting she needs. Raina fails to identify the fake painting and she contacts Deven for the M.F. Hussain over the phone, and he acts to be the owner of the painting and sells it to Raina. She gives Rs. 60 lakhs to Deven but later her boss realizes it's a fake, and fires her immediately. She expresses her story of being conned by a man named Deven Shah to the media which, spreads like wildfire. This news is seen by Dimple and suspects that maybe Deven Shah could be Sunny and they may have been conned by the same person.

Story 3: Lucknow

A young widow named Saira Rashid calls Raina and explains her story of being conned by a person named Iqbal Khan into giving away Rs. 10 lakhs through her father-in-law and duping his garment business.

Story 4: Goa and Beyond

Raina calls over Dimple and Saira to Mumbai, where they make a plan, locate and con the man who conned them and name him "Bloody Kameena" (BK).

To trace BK, they use his ringtone clue to find his name as Diego Vaz from Goa. They hire a saleswoman, Ishika Desai to act like a millionaire heiress, Ishika Patel, who wants to open a restaurant chain in India with the help of the "Bloody Kameena" so that if he invested money in the restaurant, they could sneakily steal the money and escape, thus ruining the BK. The four divas set out to Goa, and start their trap. The BK slowly starts falling into it, but he never realizes he is being conned. Ishika says she can't con him anymore because they love each other, and the BK has no clue of it. Dimple begins to argue loudly with her and is overheard by Vikram Thapar who was waiting outside the door for Ishika.

He is heartbroken and realizes the pain he gave to everyone when he conned them but still out of ego-driven vengeance, he makes a plan to con the four girls. He himself originally purchases a swamp worth Rs. 3 lakh and as the con blows it cost to 90 lakhs. All girls blame Ishika for cheating and take their anger out on her. The three now return home, only to find Vikram Thapar (Ranveer Singh) sitting in their garden, with the Rs.1 crore. He explains why he came back, and that he didn't feel good about conning the girl he truly loved, and that the four girls have changed him into now becoming an honest and decent man. He returns the money he stole from them and leaves.

The girls realize the love Ishika has for Vikram and reunite them. He proposes to her but Ishika asks his real name, to which he reveals himself as "Ricky Bahl", and the story ends with a kiss, as the three girls leave.

Cast 
 Ranveer Singh as Ricky Bahl (Sunny Singh in Delhi, Deven Shah, Manoj Suri in Mumbai, Iqbal Khan in Lucknow, Vikram Thapar, Diego Vaz, Abhay Salaskar in Goa)
Anushka Sharma as Ishika Desai (Ishika Patel)
 Parineeti Chopra as Dimple Chaddha
 Dipannita Sharma as Raina Parulekar
 Aditi Sharma as Saira Rashid
 Shireesh Sharma as Mr. Suresh Chaddha, Dimple's father
 Avijit Dutt as Raina's boss
 Akshay Anand as Raina's colleague
 Sheena Bajaj in a cameo appearance as the nurse in the title track
 Shruti Sharma (actress) as Customer in Story:3 Lucknow

Equipment 
Aseem Mishra and Ravi K Chandran have used an Angenieux Optimo as zoom lens.

Reception

Release 
The film was released in India on 9 December 2011. Upon release, it received mixed to positive response from critics. Bollywood actress Priyanka Chopra's cousin, Parineeti Chopra, made her acting debut in the film and most critics have praised her highly for her acting skills. Taran Adarsh from Bollywood Hungama gave 3 out of 5 stars and said: "Ladies Vs Ricky Bahl is, at best, a decent fare, which appeals in parts. The film starts well, even ends well. It's the in between that's plain ordinary. Ideally, the film merits a two-and-a-half star rating, but that extra half star is for Ranveer and Anushka, who steal your heart with truly striking performances." Nikhat Kazmi from The Times of India gave 2.5 of 5 stars adding: "There is no humour, no earthy flavour, no tingling chemistry between the lead pair. What does work in favour of the film are its performances and its non-hysterical tenor." Komal Nahta from Koimoi gave it a 3-star as well stating: Ladies Vs Ricky Bahl is a fair entertainer. What is good about it is: The basic plotline; some con-game sequences; performances; music NDTV gave the film 3.5 stars from 5, calling it predictable and adding that the loses out on the great chemistry between the two leads. But it is still great to watch. However, he praised the performance of Ranveer Singh. So did Rajeev Masand who, in his review for IBN Live, described it as watchable but thought that it could've been so much more fun. Zee News gave it 3/5 stars, stating: "A good option to get entertained this weekend and reconnect with the Band Baaja Baaraat Jodi for some laughter and foot stomping again! Go watch Ladies Vs Ricky Bahl."

Box office 
Ladies vs Ricky Bahl had a biggest first day with many places recording high first day collections, but some multiplexes recording 90–100% for the first day. The collection improved well in Delhi and Punjab area throughout the day. The multiplex-dominated areas saw good to decent occupancy while single-screened areas remain on lower side. The film had a decent first day collections of  198.5 million. During the second day of release, it showed good improvement and collected  445 million. Collections rose once again on Sunday and it collected  767.5 million to bring the 3-day total to  805 million approx. The film remained steady on Monday, with collections around  815 million nett, taking the four-day total to  million nett approx. The film also put up a decent first week collection, grossing  730 million nett. Overall, it did decent business at the box office and earned  840 million in full theatrical run and declared hit at the box office. [IMDB] Rated it 6 out of 10 stating A smooth and charming conman, Ricky Bahl, cons girls for a living but finally meets his match is this fun-filled "ROM-CON."

Awards

Soundtrack 

The song "Jigar Da Tukda" won the most atrocious lyrics award at the Golden Kela Awards in 2012.

Plagiarism allegations 
Director Selva accused the makers of Ladies vs Ricky Bahl of plagiarising his 2007 Tamil film Naan Avanillai and its 2009 sequel, both which followed a con artist marrying several women under various identities. British novelist Jeffrey Archer accused the makers of plagiarising his 1976 novel Not a Penny More, Not a Penny Less.

References

External links 

 Official Website
 

2010s Hindi-language films
2011 films
2011 romantic comedy films
Films about con artists
Films directed by Maneesh Sharma
Films involved in plagiarism controversies
Films set in Goa
Films shot in Delhi
Films shot in Goa
Films shot in Lucknow
Indian films about revenge
Indian romantic comedy films
Yash Raj Films films